The 2021 season is Perak's 18th consecutive season in Malaysia Super League, the top flight of Malaysian football. The club also will participate the Malaysia Cup.

Management team

Players

Transfers and contracts

Transfers in
Pre-season

Mid-season

Transfers out
Pre-season

Mid-season

Friendlies

Pre-season

Mid-season

Competitions

Malaysia Super League

League table

Fixtures and results

Malaysia Cup

Group stage

The draw for the group stage was held on 15 September 2021.

Statistics

Appearances and goals

{| class="wikitable sortable plainrowheaders" style="text-align:center"
|-
! rowspan="2" |
! rowspan="2" |
! rowspan="2" style="width:180px;" |Player
! colspan="2" style="width:87px;" |League
! colspan="2" style="width:87px;" |Malaysia Cup
! colspan="2" style="width:87px;" |Total
|-
!
!Goals
!
!Goals
!
!Goals
|-
|1
|GK
! scope="row" | Nasrullah Aziz

|1
|0

|0
|0

!1
!0
|-
|2
|DF
! scope="row" | Danish Haziq

|13+3
|0

|3
|0

!19
!0
|-
|4
|DF
! scope="row" | Charlie Machell 

|7
|0

|4
|0

!11
!0
|-
|5
|MF
! scope="row" | Jad Noureddine 

|4
|0

|4
|0

!8
!0
|-
|6
|DF
! scope="row" | Izaaq Izhan

|0+1
|0

|1+1
|0

!3
!0
|-
|7
|FW
! scope="row" | Nana Poku

|9+1
|5

|2
|0

!12
!5
|-
|9
|FW
! scope="row" | Ezequiel Agüero

|13+2
|2

|2
|1

!17
!3
|-
|12
|DF
! scope="row" | Azhar Apandi

|0+1
|0

|0
|0

!1
!0
|-
|14
|MF
! scope="row" | Firdaus Saiyadi

|8+7
|0

|4
|0

!19
!0
|-
|15
|DF
! scope="row" | Idris Ahmad

|16+3
|0

|2
|0

!21
!0
|-
|17
|DF
! scope="row" | Zoubairou Garba

|0+1
|0

|0
|0

!1
!0
|-
|19
|MF
! scope="row" | Farid Khazali

|4+6
|1

|0+2
|0

!12
!1
|-
|20
|DF
! scope="row" | Rafiuddin Roddin

|13+8
|0

|1+2
|0

!24
!0
|-
|21
|MF
! scope="row" | Samir Ayass

|1+2
|0

|0
|0

!3
!0
|-
|22
|MF
! scope="row" | Zulkiffli Zakaria

|1+9
|0

|0+2
|0

!11
!0
|-
|23
|DF
! scope="row" | Amirul Azhan

|14+2
|0

|3+1
|0

!19
!0
|-
|24
|FW
! scope="row" | of Zikri

|0
|0

|0+1
|0

!1
!0
|-
|25
|DF
! scope="row" | Pavithran Selladoria

|0+4
|0

|0
|0

!4
!0
|-
|28
|GK
! scope="row" | Hafizul Hakim

|14
|0

|2
|0

!16
!0
|-
|29
|MF
! scope="row" | Farhan Roslan

|3+5
|1

|0
|0

!8
!1
|-
|30
|GK
! scope="row" | Azri Ghani

|7
|0

|2
|0

!9
!0
|-
|33
|DF
! scope="row" | Nazmi Ahmad

|4
|0

|2+1
|0

!7
!0
|-
|39
|MF
! scope="row" | Royizzat Daud

|0
|0

|1+2
|0

!3
!0
|-
|43
|FW
! scope="row" | Syahir Bashah

|5+4
|0

|3+1
|0

!13
!0
|-
|75
|FW
! scope="row" | Ghislain Guessan

|1+1
|0

|0
|0

!2
!0
|-
|77
|DF
! scope="row" | Adib Raop

|9+9
|0

|2+2
|1

!21
!1
|-
|80
|DF
! scope="row" | Khairul Syafiq

|0
|0

|0+3
|0

!3
!0
|-
|82
|MF
! scope="row" | Amier Ali

|0+1
|0

|0
|0

!1
!0
|-
|88
|MF
! scope="row" | Izzuddin Roslan

|15+3
|0

|3
|0

!21
!0
|-
|93
|MF
! scope="row" | Aizat Safuan

|0+7
|0

|3+1
|1

!11
!1
|-
|colspan="15"|Players away from the club on loan:
|-
|21
|DF
! scope="row" | Nazirul Naim

|7+3
|1

|0
|0

!10
!1
|-
|colspan="15"|Players who appeared for Perak no longer at the club:
|-
|3
|DF
! scope="row" | Shahrul Saad

|8
|0

|0
|0

!8
!0
|-
|8
|MF
! scope="row" | Leandro

|12
|1

|0
|0

!12
!1
|-
|10
|MF
! scope="row" | Careca

|11+1
|4

|0
|0

!12
!4
|-
|11
|DF
! scope="row" | Shakir Hamzah

|13
|0

|0
|0

!13
!0
|-
|12
|MF
! scope="row" | Kenny Pallraj

|10+1
|0

|0
|0

!11
!0
|-
|13
|FW
! scope="row" | Guilherme

|11+1
|4

|0
|0

!12
!4
|-
|16
|MF
! scope="row" | Partiban Janasekaran

|8+2
|1

|0
|0

!10
!1
|}

Notes

References 

Perak F.C.
Perak F.C. seasons
Perak